Pequeños Gigantes USA is a Spanish-language reality talent show that originally premiered in United States on February 6, 2017, on Univision. The show is hosted by Giselle Blondet, with Sebastián Villalobos as digital reporter.

The talent show televises six teams of talented children from the United States and Puerto Rico (each group comprises three or four children and a celebrity captain) competing against each other to receive the highest ranking at the end of each week, and for the first place and the grand prize. Each group is divided into three categories: extraordinary talent, singing, and dancing. In each group there is one child who has an extraordinary talent, one singer, and one or two dancers.

Three judges give each child category a rating based from 1 to 5. The judges consist of Mexican theater-actress Bianca Marroquín, regional Mexican singer Luis Coronel, and American singer Prince Royce.

Seasons

Season 1 (2017) 
Auditions for the first season of Pequeños Gigantes USA were held from October to December 2016. It premiered on February 6, 2017 and ended on April 6, 2017. It had 34 episodes. In the season finale the team of Peque Flow won the grand prize of $100,000 USD.

Teams

Judges

Ratings

Awards and nominations

References

External links
Official website

Univision original programming
2017 American television series debuts
2017 American television series endings
Spanish-language television in the United States